= Innocence, Knowledge, and the Construction of Childhood =

2012 book

- Author: Kerry H. Robinson
- Language: English
- Publisher: Routledge
- Publication date: November 2012
- Pages: 184
- ISBN: 978-0415607636

Innocence, Knowledge, and the Construction of Childhood: The contradictory nature of sexuality and censorship in children's contemporary lives is a book by Kerry H. Robinson, published by Routledge in 2012.
